Robert Wharton   (14 June 1751 - 19 January 1808) was Archdeacon of Stow from 1791 until his death.

Wharton was born in Durham, and was educated at Eton and Pembroke College, Cambridge.  He held the living at Sigglesthorne. He was Chancellor of the Diocese of Lincoln from 1801 until his death at Nettleham.

Notes

1751 births
18th-century English Anglican priests
19th-century English Anglican priests
Alumni of Pembroke College, Cambridge
Archdeacons of Stow
1808 deaths
People from Durham, England
People educated at Eton College